Hermie may refer to:

 Hermie (slur), a pejorative term for an intersex person
 Hermies, a village in France
 Hermie,  a character in Summer of '42
 Hermie and Friends, a Christian video series
 Hermie, a fictional character in The Smurfs
 Hermie, a character in Jungle Jam and Friends: The Radio Show!
 Hermie Sadler, a racing car driver
 Hermey, character in the TV special Rudolph the Red-Nosed Reindeer